Božena Perdykulová is a former artistic gymnast. She won the bronze medal on vault at the 1974 World Championships.

References

Year of birth missing (living people)
Living people
Medalists at the World Artistic Gymnastics Championships
Czechoslovak female artistic gymnasts
Place of birth missing (living people)
20th-century Czech women